Orange, Ohio is a village in Cuyahoga County.

Orange, Ohio may also refer to:

Orange, Coshocton County, Ohio
Orange, Delaware County, Ohio

See also
Orange Township, Ohio (disambiguation)